Wasdale is a civil parish in the Borough of Copeland, Cumbria, England. It contains eight listed buildings that are recorded in the National Heritage List for England. Of these, one is listed at Grade II*, the middle of the three grades, and the others are at Grade II, the lowest grade.  The parish is in the Lake District National Park.  It contains the village of Nether Wasdale and the community of Wasdale Head, together with the countryside, moorland and mountains surrounding Wastwater.  The listed buildings comprise two churches, two farmhouses and associated buildings, two bridges, a boundary stone, and a maypole.


Key

Buildings

References

Citations

Sources

Lists of listed buildings in Cumbria